Doliolunidae is a family of tunicates belonging to the order Doliolida.

Genera:
 Pseudusa Robison, Raskoff & Sherlock, 2005

References

Tunicates